Matthieu Jost is a French entrepreneur, founder and chief executive officer of websites misterb&b and MyGayTrip. Matthieu Jost has been ranked top 100 most inspirational and influential LGBTQ+ leader in the world by the prestigious Out Magazine.
 
Jost founded the French media company Taplanete in 2003. The company published Internet sites for television shows and music and was purchased by AlloCiné in 2004. Jost later founded the website MyGayTrip which has been referred to as a TripAdvisor type site for the LGBT community. It was founded as a joint venture along with Marc Dedonder and the French magazine Têtu. Jost founded misterb&b after a trip to Barcelona. He rented a room in a shared apartment and upon arrival was treated badly by the owner who was not expecting a gay couple. Jost felt uncomfortable by the experience and returned to Paris the next day. He then began building the site as a way for people to travel to welcoming environments. The website started as a combination MyGayTrip and short-term apartment rental service, Sejourning and has developed into an Airbnb for the LGBT community.

misterb&b now has over 300,000 hosts in 135 countries.

References

External links
 

Living people
French LGBT businesspeople
Year of birth missing (living people)